Sneedville is the only city in and the county seat of Hancock County, Tennessee, United States. The population was 1,282 per the 2020 census.

History
Settlement began in the 1790s, following the American Revolutionary War, as migrants moved into the area from the Piedmont frontiers of Virginia and North Carolina. Such migrants had formed families in colonial Virginia. Among them was a multi-racial group of settlers who became known as Melungeon. They have been documented as having primarily European and sub-Saharan African ancestry. They also have a lesser amount of Native American heritage.

The county historical society asserts that French traders noted encountering the Melungeons in the late 1600s in the area that is now east Tennessee. Such early settlement is not supported by the research of Edward Price, a cultural geographer who wrote a 1950 dissertation on the Melungeons; Dr. Virginia DeMarce, a professional genealogist; and Paul Heinegg, a genealogist; each of whom has documented the migration of ancestors of the first families known as Melungeon from Virginia and North Carolina in the late eighteenth century

When Hancock County was formed from parts of Hawkins and Claiborne counties in the 1840s, Greasy Rock was chosen as the county seat.  The city was renamed in honor of William Henry Sneed (1812–1869), an attorney from Knoxville who helped defend the new county when several residents sued in an attempt to block its creation.

Geography
Sneedville is located at  (36.532062, -83.214140).

The Clinch River passes within the city limits.

Climate
According to the Köppen climate classification, Sneedville has a humid subtropical climate, typical for Tennessee. The plant hardiness zone is 6b.

Demographics

2020 census

As of the 2020 United States census, there were 1,282 people, 573 households, and 369 families residing in the town.

2010 census
As of the 2010 United States Census, there were 1,387 people living in the city. 97.4% were White, 0.6% Black or African American, 0.3% Native American, 0.1% Asian and 1.7% of two or more races. 0.3% were Hispanic or Latino (of any race).

2000 census
As of the census of 2000, there were 1,257 people, 527 households, and 310 families living in the city. The population density was 551.0 people per square mile (212.9/km2). There were 593 housing units at an average density of 259.9 per square mile (100.4/km2). The racial makeup of the town was 97.69% White, 0.64% African American, 0.16% Native American, 0.72% from other races, and 0.80% from two or more races. Hispanic or Latino of any race were 0.24% of the population. Melungeons, a so-called "tri-racial isolate", are also present in this area, especially in the Vardy Valley, on the other side of Newman's Ridge.

There were 527 households, out of which 27.1% had children under the age of 18 living with them, 41.2% were married couples living together, 14.6% had a female householder with no husband present, and 41.0% were non-families. 38.9% of all households were made up of individuals, and 18.6% had someone living alone who was 65 years of age or older. The average household size was 2.08 and the average family size was 2.77.

In the city, the population was spread out, with 18.4% under the age of 18, 11.4% from 18 to 24, 28.2% from 25 to 44, 23.5% from 45 to 64, and 18.5% who were 65 years of age or older. The median age was 40 years. For every 100 females, there were 93.7 males. For every 100 females age 18 and over, there were 96.9 males.

The median income for a household in the city was $13,281, and the median income for a family was $20,208. Males had a median income of $20,500 versus $15,461 for females. The per capita income for the town was $13,173. About 32.9% of families and 36.3% of the population were below the poverty line, including 46.9% of those under age 18 and 28.4% of those age 65 or over.

In 2010, Sneedville had the 10th-lowest median household income of all places in the United States with a population over 1,000.

Arts and culture

Museums and related points of interest

The Hancock County Tennessee Historical and Genealogical Society is a non-profit organization located in the Old County Jail. The organization provides access to archival material related to the community and maintains a small museum displaying aspects of traditional mountain life, such as was practiced by the Melungeons. They publish a bi-yearly newsletter called Our Mountain Heritage for members of the society.

Education

Schools in Sneedville include Hancock County Middle/High School and Hancock County Elementary School.

Infrastructure

Hancock County Hospital, which opened in 2005, is located in Sneedville.

Notable people
 Doyle Lawson, a musician, lived in Sneedville as a child.
 Jimmy Martin, a musician, was born in Sneedville, dubbed "King of Bluegrass" and inducted into the International Bluegrass Music Hall of Honor.
 Morgan Wallen, multi-platinum country music artist

Crime
Sneedville and Hancock County have garnered a reputation for being a hotspot for drug trafficking, production, and distribution, with methamphetamine, oxycodone, and opioids causing a significant impact in the community.

See also
 Vardy Community School

Further reading
 Hancock County Tennessee and Its People, Volume I, II & III. Sneedsville: Hancock County Historical & Genealogical Society.
 Hancock County Tennessee Pictorial History Book. Sneedsville: Hancock County Historical & Genealogical Society.

References

External links
Sneedville/Hancock County Chamber & Community Partners Inc.

Towns in Hancock County, Tennessee
Towns in Tennessee
County seats in Tennessee